Salim Diwan (born 12 May 1985) is an Indian Bollywood film actor who made his debut in Bollywood Diaries.

Early life 
Diwan was born in the Jhunjhunu district of Rajasthan, India and was attached to local theatre groups during his school days. After completing his graduation, he started studying law in Mumbai. He later joined his father's pharmaceutical company before starting his acting career.

Career 
In 2005–06, he participated in a reality show called Jet Set Go and was given an IIFA award in Dubai. After that, he joined Kishor Namit Kapoor Institute to learn professional acting.

His debut film was Ankur Arora Murder Case, where he briefly appears in one scene. After that, he was seen in Bollywood Diaries, released on 26 February 2016. The trailer of this film was launched on 12 January 2016 in Mumbai, India. In the movie, Diwan played Rohit, a Bollywood fanatic who wishes to be a part of the Bollywood industry.

Diwan is the promoter and CEO of Rajasthan Herbals International, which is a manufacturer of Ayurvedic medicines and has more than 1400 centres across India. He is also the managing director of Nasha Mukti Kendra.

References

External links 
 

Living people
1985 births
Indian male film actors